Murarai (code:MRR) is a station located on the Sahibganj loop, located in Murarai, West Bengal. It is a small town that comes under Murarai I (community development block).

References

Rajgram 731222

Railway stations in Birbhum district
Howrah railway division
Railway stations opened in 1867